Pomonok Country Club was a country club in the northeastern United States, located in what is now the Pomonok neighborhood of the New York City borough of Queens.  The golf course was located between Kissena Boulevard and 164th Street, just to the south of Horace Harding Boulevard (now the Long Island Expressway) and to the east of Queens College.

The club was established in 1886 by members of the Flushing Athletic Club in southern Flushing and moved to the Kissena Boulevard location in 1921. Devereux Emmet designed the golf course; the members disbanded and sold the course  Part of the site today contains the Electchester cooperative housing development, Pomonok public housing, and an extension of Parsons Boulevard.

The former course of Fresh Meadow Country Club was a few miles east; it hosted the PGA Championship in 1930 and the U.S. Open in 1932.

References 

Golf clubs and courses in New York (state)
Sports venues in Queens, New York
Golf clubs and courses designed by Devereux Emmet
Defunct sports clubs in the United States
1886 establishments in New York (state)
1949 disestablishments in New York (state)